Murad Agayev (born 9 February 1993 in Stavropol, Russia) is an Azerbaijani football player.

Career
In June 2013, Agayev signed for AZAL from Sumgayit. After one season at AZAL he returned to Sumgayit.

On 17 June 2016, Agayev signed a two-year contract with Neftchi Baku
Agayev was released by Sabail FK at the end of the 2017–18 season.

Career statistics

Club

International

Statistics accurate as of match played 24 February 2012

References

1993 births
Living people
Citizens of Azerbaijan through descent
Azerbaijani footballers
Azerbaijan international footballers
Russian footballers
Russian sportspeople of Azerbaijani descent
Sportspeople from Stavropol
AZAL PFK players
Sumgayit FK players
Neftçi PFK players
Sabail FK players
Shamakhi FK players
Azerbaijan Premier League players
Association football midfielders